Three ships of the Royal Navy have been named HMS Stalker:

  was a converted trawler
  was an escort carrier previously USS Hamlin
  was a Landing Ship, Tank previously LST 3515

Royal Navy ship names